Air Marshal Arvindra Singh Butola, PVSM, VM, VSM is a retired officer of the Indian Air Force. He was the Air Officer Commanding-in-Chief (AOC-in-C), Training Command, and assumed office on 14 October 2019 succeeding Air Marshal Surendra Kumar Ghotia. Air Marshal AS Butola superannuated on 30 September 2020.

Early life and education 
Butola graduated from National Defence Academy Khadakwasla in May 1981. He is an alumnus of the Defence Services Staff College, Wellington and the National Defence College, New Delhi.

Career
Butola was commissioned as a helicopter pilot in the Indian Air Force in June 1982. He was a qualified flight instructor and had a flying experience of over 6700 hours on 21 different types of aircraft.

He has commanded a helicopter unit in Jammu and Kashmir, and had also been senior flying instructor and advisor to Namibian Defence Force. His other appointments included chief test pilot at Hindustan Aeronautics Limited, station commander of an air base under Western Air Command, senior officer-in-charge of administration of an operational command, as well as assistant chief of air staff operations (transport and helicopters) at air headquarters.

Butola assumed office of Commandant Air Force Academy on 4 September 2018 and served there till his appointment as AOC-in-C Training Command. Prior to Commandant of Air Force Academy, he served as Senior Air Staff Officer, Central Air Command, taking over on 1 August 2016.

Honours and decorations 
During his career of 37 years, Butola has been awarded the Vayusena Medal (VM) and Vishisht Seva Medal (VSM) and the Param Vishisht Seva Medal in 2021 for his service.

References 

Living people
Indian Air Force air marshals
National Defence Academy (India) alumni
Recipients of the Vayu Sena Medal
Recipients of the Vishisht Seva Medal
Year of birth missing (living people)
National Defence College, India alumni
Military personnel from Uttarakhand
Commandants of the Indian Air Force Academy
Recipients of the Param Vishisht Seva Medal
Defence Services Staff College alumni